This list contains the names of albums that contain a hidden track and also information on how to find them. Not all printings of an album contain the same track arrangements, so some copies of a particular album may not have the hidden track(s) listed below. Some of these tracks may be hidden in the pregap, and some hidden simply as a track following the listed tracks. The list is ordered by artist name using the surname where appropriate.

 Q-Tip, Amplified: After the track "End of Time," the hidden track "Do It, See It, Be It" starts playing.
 Queen:
 A Day at the Races: The first 1:03 of the first track are the track "Intro," which is only mentioned on the actual 1993 CD with its own track number (track 1), shifting the remaining tracks one track number over. The content on the disc itself though does not separate the intro.
 Made in Heaven: "Yeah," a 4-second choral harmony of the word "yeah," linking onto the end of the previous song, "It's A Beautiful Day (Reprise)," and followed by an untitled instrumental track, a 23-minute ambient piece, which ends with Freddie Mercury saying "Fab." The two hidden tracks and "It's A Beautiful Day (Reprise)" are often seen as one song when run in the order they are on the album ("It's a Beautiful Day (Reprise)," then "Yeah," then "Untitled")
 Greatest Video Hits 1: The flame version of the music video for "Bohemian Rhapsody" plays when the "Rhapsody" menu on the second DVD is displayed while the key combination "Up, Up, Right, Right, Left, Left" is entered.
 Queens of the Stone Age:
 Rated R: Track 9 is actually a reprise of "Feel Good Hit of the Summer," which makes "Tension Head" track 10, "Lightning Song" track 11, and "I Think I Lost My Headache" track 12 instead of what the album's track listing suggests.
 Songs for the Deaf: 3 secret tracks: "The Real Song for the Deaf" appears when you rewind track 1 until -1:35. After "Song For the Deaf" (track 13) there's the 2nd secret track, "Feel Good Haha of the Summer," which starts at 5:45. This is followed by a fourteenth track titled "Mosquito Song" (it's actually listed as a "secret song" on the album's track listing).
 Lullabies to Paralyze: About 20 seconds after "Long Slow Goodbye" comes a hidden orchestral finale.
 Queensrÿche:
 Empire: Immediately after the end of "Anybody Listening," sounds of waves are heard, along with muffled voices. This is believed to be a recording of Geoff Tate on a boat. The sequence ends with a thud.

See also
 List of backmasked messages
 List of albums with tracks hidden in the pregap

References 

Q